The 1976 Maryland Terrapins football team represented University of Maryland in the 1976 NCAA Division I football season. The Terrapins offense scored 294 points while the defense allowed 115 points. Led by head coach Jerry Claiborne, the Terrapins appeared in the Cotton Bowl Classic.

Schedule

1977 NFL Draft
The following players were selected in the 1977 NFL Draft.

References

Maryland
Maryland Terrapins football seasons
Atlantic Coast Conference football champion seasons
Maryland Terrapins football